ITCC may refer to:

 Irish Touring Car Championship
 Italian Touring Car Championship
 1996 International Touring Car Championship
 International T-Class Confederation
 International Theological Correspondence College